The women's long jump at the 2022 European Athletics Championships took place at the Olympiastadion on 16 and 18 August.

Records

Schedule

Results

Qualification

Qualification: 6.75 m (Q) or best 12 performers (q)

Final

References

Long jump
Long jump at the European Athletics Championships
Euro